The Conway River is a  river in the U.S. state of Virginia.  Rising near the triple junction of Madison, Greene and Page counties at the crest of Shenandoah National Park, the river flows south, then southeast to the Rapidan River northwest of Burtonville.  The river is part of the Rappahannock River watershed.

See also
List of rivers of Virginia
Fairfax Line

References

USGS Hydrologic Unit Map - State of Virginia (1974)

Rivers of Virginia
Tributaries of the Rappahannock River
Rivers of Madison County, Virginia
Rivers of Greene County, Virginia
Rivers of Page County, Virginia